The 2010–11 CERH European League was the 46th edition of the CERH European League organized by CERH. Its Final Eight was held in May 2011 in Andorra la Vella, Andorra.

Group stage
In each group, teams played against each other home-and-away in a home-and-away round-robin format.

The group winners and runners-up advanced to the Final Eight.

Group A

Group B

Group C

Group D

Final eight
The final eight was played at the Poliesportiu d'Andorra. It is the biggest multi-arena in Andorra la Vella with a capacity of 1,750.

Bracket
Bracket for the final eight.

Results

Quarterfinals

Semifinals

Final

External links
 Official website
 
 CERH website

International
  Roller Hockey links worldwide
  Mundook-World Roller Hockey
 Hardballhock-World Roller Hockey
 Inforoller World Roller Hockey 
  World Roller Hockey Blog
 rink-hockey-news - World Roller Hockey

International sports competitions hosted by Andorra
2010 in roller hockey
2011 in roller hockey
Roller hockey in Andorra
2011 in Andorran sport
Rink Hockey Euroleague